Felipe Pinzón Sánchez or Felipe Pinzón Solis (23 August 1917 – May 2015) was a Peruvian chess player, four-times Peruvian Chess Championship winner (1947, 1950, 1951, 1952).

Biography
From the late 1930s to the mid-1960s, Felipe Pinzón Sánchez was one of the leading Peruvian chess players. He won Peruvian Chess Championships four times: in 1947 (shared 1st place with Julio Súmar Casis and won additional match), 1950, 1951 and 1952. In 1951, Felipe Pinzón Sánchez participated in FIDE South America Zonal tournament.

Felipe Pinzón Sánchez played for Peru in the Chess Olympiads:
 In 1939, at second board in the 8th Chess Olympiad in Buenos Aires (+3, =2, -8),
 In 1950, at fourth board in the 9th Chess Olympiad in Dubrovnik (+5, =5, -5),
 In 1964, at reserve board in the 16th Chess Olympiad in Tel Aviv (+5, =2, -1).

References

Further reading

External links

Felipe Pinzón Sánchez chess games at 365chess.com

1917 births
2015 deaths
Peruvian chess players
Chess Olympiad competitors
20th-century Peruvian people
21st-century Peruvian people